Country Style is an album by American folk musician Ramblin' Jack Elliott, released in 1962.

Reception

Writing for Allmusic, music critic Ronnie D. Lankford, Jr. wrote the album "On Country Style, one can see the rambling doctor's son come into his own as a performer... Elliott steps away from the past to carve out an irreverent, slap-happy style that showed that folk music, when handled without studious care, could be a helluva lot of fun... Country Style represents the first flowering of Elliott's talent and turning point for folk traditionalism."

Reissues
Country Style was reissued on CD by Fantasy Records in 1999 along with Jack Elliott at the Second Fret.

Track listing 
All songs Traditional unless otherwise noted.

Side one
"Mean Mama Blues" (Charles Mitchell, Moon Mullican)
"Low and Lonely" (Fred Rose)
"Wreck of the Old '97" (Henry Clay Work)
"Old Shep" (Red Foley)
"Wabash Cannonball" (A. P. Carter)
"Brown Eyes"
"Lovesick Blues" (Cliff Friend, Irving Mills)

Side two
"Arthritis Blues" (Butch Hayes) 
"Take Me Back and Love Me One More Time"
"Tennessee Stud" (Jimmy Driftwood)
"Those Brown Eyes" (Alan Arkin, Bill Carey, Erik Darling, Woody Guthrie)
"Detour" (Paul Westmoreland)
"Soldier's Last Letter" (Ernest Tubb, Redd Stewart)

Personnel
Ramblin' Jack Elliott – vocals, harmonica, guitar
Technical
Hal Lustig - recording
Don Schlitten - design, photography

References

External links
Ramblin' Jack Elliott Illustrated discography

1962 albums
Prestige Records albums
Ramblin' Jack Elliott albums